Pitika Ntuli (born 1942, in Springs, Gauteng) is a South African sculptor, poet, writer, and academic who spent 32 years of his life in exile in Swaziland and the UK. He holds an MFA from the Pratt Institute in New York and an MA in Comparative Industrial Relations and Industrial Sociology. While in exile in the UK he taught at Camberwell College of Art, Central Saint Martins College of Art and Design, the London College of Printing, Middlesex University and the University of East London. Since returning to South Africa he has taught at Wits and UKZN.
 
Pitika Ntuli has exhibited in several individual and group exhibitions in many countries in Europe and in the US, and has organised numerous international art and cultural events in Britain. His sculptures are in several private collections worldwide, including that of Paul Simon, Phuthuma Nhleko, and Edward and Irene Akufo-Addo. Some of his public sculptures can be found in the Swaziland National Bank, St. Mary's Catholic Church in Lobamba, COSATU House, Johannesburg, and Dieploof, Soweto. Until 2010 he had never exhibited in his own country. He had his first exhibition in South Africa at Museum Africa, Johannesburg in 2010, followed by exhibitions in the Durban Art Gallery and the UNISA Gallery, Pretoria in 2011. 'The Scent of Invisible Footprints: the Sculpture of Pitika Ntuli' was published by UNISA to accompany his Exhibition at Museum Africa. He has subsequently exhibited at Constitutional Hill and Melrose Arch in Johannesburg and the Oliver Tambo Cultural Centre in Ekhuruleni.

Pitika Ntuli is an expert in African indigenous knowledge systems. He is a regular political and cultural commentator on TV and Radio. He is a well-known poet and speaker who has been a keynote speaker at numerous high-profile events and has read his poetry in many forums in the country and the Region.He is a frequent guest on TV and Radio and especially on many of the SABC African Language Radio stations, and has also participated in several national and provincial task teams and ministerial advisory committees.

He was a judge for the Sunday Times Literary Awards (2009). He chaired the 2010 Task Team that advised the Minister of Arts and Culture with regard to cultural programmes associated with the World Cup, including the opening and closing ceremonies.

Pitika is married to Antoinette Ntuli; they have four sons, two daughters and four grandchildren.

References

1942 births
Living people
South African sculptors
South African poets
Black British artists
Pratt Institute alumni